Year 944 (CMXLIV) was a leap year starting on Monday (link will display the full calendar) of the Julian calendar.

Events 
 By place 

 Byzantine Empire 
 Arab–Byzantine War: Byzantine forces are defeated by Sayf al-Dawla. He captures the city of Aleppo, and extends his control over the Al-Jazira–Upper Mesopotamia region. Al-Dawla's rule is recognized by the Ikhshidids. With the recovery of Edessa, the Greeks also obtain the fabled Image of Edessa.
 August 15 – The "Holy Mandylion" (a cloth with the face of Jesus) is conveyed to Constantinople, where it arrives on the feast of the Dormition of the Theotokos. A triumphal entry is staged for the relic in the capital.
 December 16 – Emperor Romanos I is arrested and deposed after a 14-year reign by his own sons, the co-emperors Stephen and Constantine. He is carried off to the Prince Islands and forced to become a monk.

 Europe 
 King Hugh of Provence dispatches an embassy to King Otto I of the East Frankish Kingdom, offering a large sum of cash if he promises not to provide assistance to Berengar of Ivrea. Otto refuses this offer.
 Raymond III (or Pons I), count of Toulouse, travels to Nevers (southeast of Paris) to declare his fidelity to king Louis IV ("d'Outremer"). He is granted the title 'prince of the Aquitanians' by the king.
 The largest recorded epidemic of ergotism, also known as "Saint Anthony's Fire, kills 40,000 people in France. <ref>Lewis' Dictionary of Toxicology, p. 286 </ref>

 England 
 King Edmund I regains (with the help of Danish settlers) the territory he ceded to Olaf Guthfrithson. He conquers Northumbria and cedes Cumberland to Malcolm I, king of the 'Picts and Scots'.
 A great storm sweeps across Wessex and many houses are destroyed, 1,500 in London alone (a significant proportion of the town).

 Africa 
 Abu Yazid, a Kharijite Berber leader, launches a rebellion in the Aurès Mountains (modern Algeria) against the Fatamids, seeking aid from the Caliphate of Córdoba in Al-Andalus.
 The cities of Algiers and Miliana are re-founded by the Zirid ruler (emir'') Buluggin ibn Ziri.

 By topic 

 Religion 
 The Al-Askari Mosque is built in Samarra (modern Iraq).

Births 
 Abd al-Malik I, Samanid emir (d. 961)
 Al-Mu'ayyad Ahmad, Muslim imam (d. 1020)
 Fujiwara no Akimitsu, Japanese bureaucrat (d. 1021)
 Fujiwara no Sukemasa, Japanese statesman (d. 998)
 Ibn Juljul, Muslim physician (approximate date)
 John VIII bar Abdoun, patriarch of Antioch (d. 1033)
 Otto (or Odo), duke of Burgundy (d. 965)

Deaths 
 February 25 – Lin Ding, Chinese official and chancellor
 April 8 – Wang Yanxi, emperor of Min (Ten Kingdoms)
 April 23 – Wichmann the Elder, Frankish nobleman
 Abu Mansur al-Maturidi, Muslim theologian (b. 853)
 Abu Tahir al-Jannabi, Qarmatian ruler (b. 906)
 Choe Eon-wui, Korean minister and calligrapher (b. 868)
 Donnchad Donn, High King of Ireland
 Duan Siping, ruler of Dali (approximate date)
 Fang Gao, Chinese official and chief of staff
 Flaithbertach mac Inmainén, Irish abbot 
 Harshavarman II, Angkorian king
 Li, empress of Min (Ten Kingdoms)
 Liu Hongchang, Chinese chancellor
 Mahipala I, Gurjara-Pratihara king
 Ngo Quyen, Vietnamese king
 Wang Yacheng, Chinese prince

References